Ballou Jean-Yves Tabla (born 31 March 1999) is a Canadian professional soccer player who plays as a winger for TFF First League club Manisa.

Early life
Tabla was born in Abidjan, Ivory Coast, on 31 March 1999, and he moved as a child to Canada. He was raised in Quebec. He played youth soccer with AS Pointe-aux-Trembles, a local amateur team. Tabla first joined the Montreal Impact Academy in 2012. On 9 December 2013, he left the club to join local amateur team CS Panellinios. In April 2015, he returned to the Impact as part of the team's U18 side which finished the 2014/15 U.S. Soccer Development Academy in first place in the overall standings.

Club career

FC Montreal
On 10 November 2015, it was announced that Tabla had signed for FC Montreal, the second team of the Impact which competed in the United Soccer League, the second tier of the Canadian soccer league system. He made his professional debut on 9 April 2016 and scored his first professional goal as Montreal fell 1–2 to Toronto FC II. In doing so he became the youngest player to debut in Major League Soccer in the club's history. While with FC Montreal, Tabla regularly trained with the first team which included fellow Ivorian Didier Drogba. In February 2016, Tabla and three of his teammates had a training stint with Bologna F.C. 1909 of Serie A.

In April 2016, it was revealed that Tabla was being eyed by numerous big teams in Europe including Premier League clubs Arsenal, Manchester City, and Chelsea, along with F.C Barcelona. He was first spotted by scouts during a U20 match in March 2016 in which Canada beat England by a score of 2–1. It was also revealed that several European clubs had inquired about taking the player in on a trial.

Montreal Impact
On 20 October 2016, the Montreal Impact announced they had signed Tabla to a two-year contract as a Homegrown Player, which would begin in the 2017 season.

On 8 August 2017, the Montreal Gazette reported that Tabla  "missed practice Tuesday as the MLS team confirmed it has received a transfer offer for the 18-year-old from a second-division European club." The next day Tabla issued an apology through Twitter.

Barcelona B
On 25 January 2018, Tabla signed with FC Barcelona B on an initial three-year deal, with an optional two-year extension. His buyout clause was set at €25 million for the first three years, which would rise to €75 million if his contract option is picked up.

Loan to Albacete 
On 31 January 2019, Tabla joined Segunda División side Albacete Balompié on loan until the end of the 2018–19 season.

Return to Montreal Impact
Tabla returned to Montreal on loan through to the end of the 2019 MLS season on August 7, 2019. In January 2020, Tabla signed with Montreal on a permanent transfer. Tabla did not feature much in the 2021 season, but he did play a crucial role in the club's Canadian Championship run, scoring two goals in stoppage time to give Montréal a 3-1 victory in the quarterfinals over HFX Wanderers FC, allowing Montreal to advance and ultimately win the trophy. After the 2021 season, CF Montreal would announce that they would not exercise the option on Tabla's contract, making him a free agent.

Atlético Ottawa
On 15 February 2022, Tabla signed a three-year contract with Canadian Premier League side Atlético Ottawa through the 2024 season. He made his debut on April 9 in Ottawa's season opener against Cavalry FC. Tabla scored his first goal for his new club on April 29, netting a late equalizer in a 2-2 draw with York United at York Lions Stadium.

Manisa 
On 25 January 2023, it was officially announced that Tabla had joined TFF First League side Manisa for an undisclosed fee. He subsequently made his debut for the Turkish club four days later, coming in as a substitute for Edgar Prib in the 62nd minute of a 1-1 league draw against Denizlispor.

International career

Youth 
Tabla was 14 years old when he first participated in a national camp. He has represented Canada at the U15, U17, U18, and U20 levels.  He was named to Canada's squad for the 2015 CONCACAF U-17 Championship. In 2014, he was named the Canada U17 Male Player of the Year. In 2015, he played with the Canada U18s at the Slovakia Cup. In August 2016, Tabla was called up to the U-20 team for a pair of friendlies against Costa Rica In 2016, he was named the Canada Soccer U20 Player of the Year for his performances with the U-20 squad in friendlies against England and Honduras.

He later refused call-ups to Canada, citing a possibility to play for the Ivory Coast. It was reported that he sought advice from Didier Drogba, a former Ivory Coast striker with whom he struck a friendship during their time in Montreal. In September 2018, Tabla declared his international allegiance to Canada.

Senior 
On 17 October 2018, Tabla made his senior national team debut, in a 2019–20 CONCACAF Nations League qualification match against Dominica. Tabla replaced Jonathan David in the 54th minute.

Tabla was named to the Canadian U-23 provisional roster for the 2020 CONCACAF Men's Olympic Qualifying Championship on February 26, 2020. He was named to the final squad on March 10, 2021.

Career statistics

Club

International

Honours

Club 
Barcelona
UEFA Youth League: 2017–18

Atlético Ottawa
 Canadian Premier League
Regular Season: 2022

Individual 
Canada Soccer U20 Player of the Year: 2016
Canada Soccer U17 Player of the Year: 2014
FSQ Male Youth Player of Excellence: 2014, 2015

References

External links

1999 births
Living people
People from Abidjan
Canadian soccer players
Canadian expatriate sportspeople in Spain
Expatriate footballers in Spain
Canada men's youth international soccer players
Ivorian footballers
Canadian people of Ivorian descent
Ivorian emigrants to Canada
FC Montreal players
CF Montréal players
FC Barcelona Atlètic players
Albacete Balompié players
Atlético Ottawa players
Manisa FK footballers
Association football wingers
USL Championship players
Major League Soccer players
Segunda División players
Canadian Premier League players
TFF First League players
Homegrown Players (MLS)